Monsteroideae is a subfamily of flowering plants in the family Araceae.

This subfamily is notable for having many trichosclereids in the vegetative and floral parts of the plants, but rarely in the roots.

Tribes and genera

Monotypic tribes
 Anadendreae: genus Anadendrum - SE Asia
 Heteropsideae: genus Heteropsis - S America

Monstereae
 Alloschemone - Amazon region (Bolivia, Brazil)
 Amydrium - SE Asia
 Epipremnum - Himalayas, SE Asia to Australia
 Monstera  – tropical Americas and common houseplants
 Rhaphidophora - tropical Africa, Asia to W. Pacific.
 Rhodospatha – tropical Americas
 Scindapsus - SE Asia, New Guinea, Queensland, W Pacific Islands
 Stenospermation - central and South America

Spathiphylleae
 Holochlamys - New Guinea, Bismarck Archipelago
 Spathiphyllum - tropical Americas, SE Asia including the Philippines and east of the Wallace line

References

 Bown, Deni (2000). Aroids: Plants of the Arum Family [ILLUSTRATED]. Timber Press. 

 
Alismatales subfamilies